Berosus exiguus is a species of water scavenger beetles found in the United States, the Bahamas, and Cuba. These beetles are small, ranging from 2.0 to 3.5 mm in length. They can be identified by their small size, yellowish-brown head, distinctly impressed elytral striae (stripes), and often faint spots on the elytra.

References

Hydrophilinae
Beetles described in 1825